"(He's Got) The Look" is a song by American singer Vanessa Williams, released as the second single from her debut studio album, The Right Stuff (1988). The single peaked at number 10 on Billboards Hot Black Singles chart. The song was co-written and produced by Amir Bayyan.

Track listings
US 7-inch single
A-Side "(He's Got) The Look" – 4:20
B-Side "The Right Stuff" (Rex's Mix, LA Style) – 4:32

CD single
"(He's Got) The Look" (Dance Version) – 6:38 	
"(He's Got) The Look" (Dub Version) – 5:26 	
"The Right Stuff" (Rex's Mix - LA Style) – 4:32

12-inch maxi single
A1 "(He's Got) The Look" (Radio Version) – 4:20 	
A2 "(He's Got) The Look" (Dance Version) – 6:38 	
B1 "(He's Got) The Look" (Dub Version) – 5:26 	
B2 "(He's Got) The Look" (Album Version) – 5:07

Charts

Notes

References

1988 singles
1988 songs
Music videos directed by Alek Keshishian
Songs written by Amir Bayyan
Vanessa Williams songs
Wing Records singles